Black Snake is a locality in the Gympie Region, Queensland, Australia.

Geography 
The eastern and western boundaries of the locality follow mountain ridges. Most of the developed land is in the valley between them where Coppermine Creek rises and flows north, eventually becoming a tributary of Wide Bay Creek and ultimately the Mary River. The predominant land use is cattle grazing.

Some of the eastern parts of the locality are within the protected areas of Oakview National Park and Oakview Conservation Park.

History 

Education 
There are no schools in Black Snake. The nearest primary school is in Kilkivan and the nearest secondary school is in Gympie.

References 

Gympie Region
Localities in Queensland